Hinson may refer to:

 Hinson (surname)
 Hinson, Florida, United States
 Hinson Mounds, a historic site near Miles City, Florida, United States
 Hinson's Island, Bermuda
 The Hinsons, several different southern gospel singing groups